A black light is a lamp which operates near the ultraviolet range of light

Black Light or Blacklight may also refer to:

Arts, entertainment, and media

Comics
Black Light (2000 AD), a science fiction thriller series published in the British comic anthology 2000 AD in 1996 
 Blacklight (Fox Atomic Comics), a comic book and video game

Fictional characters
 Blacklight (Image Comics), two Image Comics characters
 Blacklight (MC2), a Marvel Comics character

Games
 Blacklight: Retribution, a 2012 online first-person shooter video game
 Blacklight: Tango Down, a 2010 first-person shooter video game

Music 
 Black Light (Groove Armada album), a 2010 album by Groove Armada
 Blacklight (Iris album), 2010
 Black Light (John McLaughlin album), a 2015 album by John McLaughlin
 Blacklight (Tedashii album), 2011
 The Black Light, a 1998 album by Calexico
 "Black Lights", a song by Medina from Forever

Other uses in arts, entertainment, and media
 Black Light (novel), a 1996 Bob Lee Swagger novel by Stephen Hunter
 Blacklight (film), a 2022 American action thriller film, starring Liam Neeson

Software 
 Blacklight (software), or Project Blacklight, an information retrieval user interface software used by libraries and museums
 BlackLight, a rootkit detection utility from F-Secure

Other uses 
 BlackLight Power, a company founded by Randell L. Mills, who claims to have discovered a new energy source

See also 
 
 
 Backlighting (lighting design), a technique for photography or the stage
 Backlight, a form of illumination used in liquid crystal displays (LCDs)
 Black Lamp (disambiguation)
 Black Lantern
 Dark Light (disambiguation)